Ara Baliozian (born 10 December 1936) is an Armenian author, translator, and critic who is published in both Armenian and English.

Born in Athens, Greece, Baliozian received his education at the Mekhitarist College of Moorat-Raphael in Venice, Italy, where he also studied economics and political science at the Ca' Foscari University of Venice. He lives in Ontario, Canada, where he devotes his  to writing.  He is also the winner of many prizes and government grants for his literary work, which includes fiction, drama, literary criticism, and translations from Armenian, French, and Italian. In recent years he posted his works on different Armenian internet discussion boards.

Memoirs and fiction

The Horrible Silence: An Autobiographical Novella (Maral Press, 1982)
In the New World (Voskedar, 1982)
The Call of the Crane/The Ambitions of a Pig (Voskedar, 1983)
The Greek Poetess and Other Writings (Impressions Publishers, 1988)

Historiographical works

The Armenians: Their History and Culture (AGBU Ararat Press, 1980)
The Armenian Genocide & The West (Impressions Publishers, 1984)
Armenia Observed: An Anthology

Critical works

Portrait of a Genius and Other Essays (A/G Press, 1980)
Views/Reviews/Interviews: Critical Articles, Conversations (A/G Press, 1982)
Voices of Fear (Impressions Publishers, 1989)
Perseverance: Ara Baliozian and the Armenian Cause (Impressions Publishers, 1990)
That Promising Reality: New Visions & Values, The Armenian Revival (Impressions Publishers, 1992)
Definitions: A Critical Companion to Armenian History and Culture (Impressions Publishers, 1998)
Unpopular Opinions (Impressions Publishers, 1998)
Fragmented Dreams: Armenians in Diaspora
Intimate Talk
Undiplomatic ObservationsPages from my Diary: 1986–1995Conversations with Nazali BagdasarianTranslations

Puzant Granian, My Land, My PeoplePuzant Granian, Selected Poems / 1936–1982Zabel Yessayan, The Gardens of Silihdar & Other Writings (Ashod Press, 1982)
Gostan Zarian, The Traveller & His Road (Ashod Press, 1981)
Gostan Zarian, Bancoop & the Bones of the Mammoth (Ashod Press, 1982)
Gostan Zarian, The Island & A Man (Kar Publishing House, 1983)
Krikor Zohrab, Zohrab: An Introduction (Kar Publishing House, 1985)

CompilationsFrom Plato to Sartre: Wisdom for ArmeniansArmenian wisdom : A Treasury of Quotations & Proverbs (2nd ed )Dictionary of Armenian Quotations'' (Impressions Publishers, 1998)

References

 The Ara Baliozian Story:Going against the Grain..

External links
 Ara Baliozian's blog, baliozian.blogspot.com
 
 

Italian emigrants to Canada
Greek emigrants to Italy
 Canadian people of Armenian descent
1936 births
2019 deaths
Greek people of Armenian descent
San Lazzaro degli Armeni alumni
People from Athens